Silent Screen (1967–1993) was an American Champion Thoroughbred racehorse.

Background
Silent Screen was trained by J. Bowes Bond for owners Sonny and Leah Ray Werbin who raced under the nom de course, Elberon Farm.

Racing career
Silent Screen was the 1969 American Champion Two-Year-Old Colt. At age three in 1970, he won the Bahamas Stakes at Hialeah Park Race Track and the Saranac Handicap at Saratoga Race Course. He ran second to winner Personality in the Wood Memorial Stakes and third to him in the second leg of the U.S. Triple Crown series, the Preakness Stakes.

Stud record
At stud, Silent Screen was the sire of a number of stakes winners. He died at Gainesway Farm, in Lexington, Kentucky on March 11, 1993, at age 26.

References
 Silent Screen's pedigree and partial racing stats

1967 racehorse births
1993 racehorse deaths
Racehorses bred in New York (state)
Racehorses trained in the United States
American Champion racehorses
Thoroughbred family 9-b